The University of Salzburg, also known as the Paris Lodron University of Salzburg (Paris-Lodron-Universität Salzburg, PLUS), is an Austrian public university in Salzburg municipality, Salzburg state, named after its founder, Prince-Archbishop Paris Lodron.

Established in 1622, the university was closed in 1810 and re-established in 1962. Nowadays, it has around 18,000 students and 2,800 employees; it is the largest educational institution in Salzburg state. It is divided into six faculties: Catholic Theology, Law and Economics, Cultural Sciences, Social Sciences, Natural Sciences, Analytical and Life Sciences.

Benedictine University 
On 23 July 1622, Archbishop Paris Lodron appointed the scholar Albert Keuslin first rector of the Benedictine university. Keuslin, a graduate of the Jesuit University of Dillingen, had established the Akademisches Gymnasium, a secondary school, at Salzburg five years earlier. By resolution of Emperor Ferdinand II, issued on October 8, the Gymnasium was raised to a university. While the Thirty Years' War raged outside the Archbishopric of Salzburg, the university was built up and maintained by a federation of Benedictine abbeys from Salzburg, Switzerland, Bavaria and Austria. In its early years, courses taught were theology, divinity, philosophy, law, and medicine.

During the Napoleonic Wars, the Prince-Archbishopric was secularized as the Electorate of Salzburg in 1803. It was ruled by Archduke Ferdinand III of Austria, a brother of Emperor Francis I, who established a Faculty of Medicine. After Salzburg was annexed by the Kingdom of Bavaria in 1810, however, the university was closed on 24 December and replaced by a Lyzeum college with sections for divinity and philosophy, as well as a school for medicine and surgery. After the Napoleonic Wars, Salzburg became part of the Austrian Empire.

The divinity section was again converted to a faculty in 1850. In World War I, plans were evolved to relocate the Francis Joseph University from Czernowitz to Salzburg, though never carried out.

University of Salzburg 

The University of Salzburg was not re-established until 1962, with a faculty of Catholic theology and a faculty of philosophy. Classes resumed in 1964, with a faculty of law added the following year. In 1975, a new federal law regulated the organisation of all Austrian universities. The University of Salzburg created four academic divisions: the Faculty of Catholic Theology, the Faculty of Law, the Faculty of Humanities, and the Faculty of Natural Sciences. A fifth division, the Faculty of Medicine, was not realized.

In 1995, the organisation of Austrian universities was further restructured with more faculty autonomy. The university gradually incorporated new academic programs through 2004 into 32 Fachbereiche or “departments”, and again, decided not to create a Faculty of Medicine.

Locations
The University of Salzburg has no central campus, occupying several buildings in Salzburg's historic centre: parts of the Salzburg Residenz building (Toskanatrakt) and on Kapitelgasse south of Salzburg Cathedral. The university library is located between the Kollegienkirche (the University Church) and the Großes Festspielhaus; attached to it is the Große Aula, or ceremonial hall.

The traditional faculty building of Humanities (Communication Studies, Sociology and Political Science) is located by the Rudolfskai, only 100 metres from Mozartplatz and Papagenoplatz. The Faculty of Sciences is housed in the second largest building in Salzburg after Hohensalzburg Fortress, and is located just further south next to Schloss Freisaal Castle and Frohnburg Castle.

Completeted in 2011, the Unipark Nonntal campus (replacing the old location at the Akademiestraße) is home to the departments of modern languages, and cultural and social sciences. The building is 17,000 square metres in size, with 5,500 students and 300 academic staff. There is a library and an Auditorium Maximum. Financing for the construction of the Unipark Nonntal was enabled by successful negotiations between Salzburg’s state governor Franz Schausberger and the Federal Ministry of Education. Originally designed in 2002 by architects Storch Ehlers Partners, it was constructed in three years.

Smaller university offices and institutes are scattered throughout the city, with arts and music being taught at the Mozarteum University Salzburg.

Alumni 
 Hannes Ametsreiter (born 1967), Austrian telecommunication manager
 Martina Berthold (born 1970), Austrian politician
 Gabi Burgstaller (born 1963), Austrian politician
 Herbert Dachs (born 1943), Austrian political scientist
 Wolfgang Eder (born 1952), Austrian iron steel manager
 Renate Egger-Wenzel (born 1961), Austrian professor of Old Testament
 Christine Esterházy (born 1959), German opera singer
 Benita Ferrero-Waldner (born 1948), Austrian diplomat and politician
 Alexandra Föderl-Schmid (born 1971), Austrian journalist
 Karl-Markus Gauß (born 1954), Austrian novelist
 Toni Giger (born 1963), Austrian ski trainer
 Erich Hackl (born 1955), Austrian novelist and short-story writer
 Gerhart Holzinger (born 1947), Austrian constitutional lawyer
 Hannes Leitgeb (born 1972), Austrian philosopher and mathematician
 Hieronymus II. Lindau, (1657–1719), Abbot of Ochsenhausen Abbey
 Franziskus Klesin (1643–1708), Abbot of Ochsenhausen Abbey
 Erwin Kräutler (born 1939), Roman Catholic bishop
 Peter Launsky-Tieffenthal (born 1957), Austrian diplomat
 Alois von und zu Liechtenstein (born 1968), Liechtensteiner heir to the throne
 Andreas Maislinger (born 1955), Austrian historian
 Leopold Mozart (1719–1787), German composer
 Marie-Louise Nosch (born 1970), Danish archaeologist
 Brigitta Pallauf (born 1960), Austrian politician
 Helga Rabl-Stadler (born 1948), Austrian politician and cultural manager
 Tobias Regner (born 1982) German singer, songwriter
 Astrid Rössler (born 1959), Austrian politician
 Abraham a Santa Clara (1644–1709), German Roman Catholic preacher and writer
 Franz Schausberger (born 1950), Austrian politician and historian
 Bernardin Schellenberger (born 1944), German Catholic theologian, priest and former Trappist
 Wolfgang Vyslozil (born 1945), Austrian media executive and lecturer
 Paulus Maria Weigele (born 1943), Abbot of Ottobeuren Abbey
 Beda Werner (1673–1725), Abbot of Ochsenhausen Abbey
 Bettina Bäumer (born 1940), Austrian-born Indian scholar and Indologist
 Ute Wartenberg, German numismatist

See also 
 List of early modern universities in Europe

References

External links 
 University of Salzburg Website 
 A brief Guide for International Students (2013) 

 
Universities and colleges in Austria
University of Salzburg
Educational institutions established in the 1620s
1810 disestablishments in the Austrian Empire
Educational institutions established in 1964
1622 establishments in Austria
1964 establishments in Austria